Lala Rookh is a 1958 Indian Hindi-language romantic drama film directed by Akhtar Siraj, starring Talat Mahmood and Shyama in lead roles. It is based on Thomas Moore's 1817 poem Lalla Rookh about a fictional daughter of the Mughal emperor Aurangzeb.

Cast
Talat Mahmood as Shah Murad
Shyama as Shehzadi

Soundtrack
Film musical score is by Khayyam and the film song lyrics by Kaifi Azmi:

References

External links
 

1958 films
1950s Hindi-language films
Films scored by Khayyam
Indian romantic drama films
Films based on poems
Poetry by Thomas Moore